Serenissima Solar Park is a 48 MW photovoltaic (PV) plant in Northeast Italy. The construction schedule was shortened by several months to meet the August 31, 2011 deadline to receive the FIT rate of EUR 0.256/kWh (USD 0.364/kWh).

On April 2, 2012, S.A.G. Solarstrom AG sold the solar park to BNP Clean Energy Partners.

See also 

 List of photovoltaic power stations
 Montalto di Castro Photovoltaic Power Station
 Solar power in Italy

References 

Photovoltaic power stations in Italy